Nothing to Lose is the fourth studio album of the Danish soft rock band Michael Learns to Rock. It was released on September 12, 1997, by Medley Records in Denmark. Like the previous album, Played on Pepper (1995), it was mainly produced by the band itself. Guitar player Mikkel Lentz said the band programmed new beats during the mixing process as they wanted to experiment a bit more with this album. While the band's previous albums relied heavily on soft rock ballads, Nothing to Lose contains a rockier sound intended to suit the European market. Bass guitar player Søren Madsen debuts as songwriter on the track "Magic".

In Denmark, Nothing to Lose sold 25,000 copies on the day of release. In May 1998, the album had sold 500,000 copies worldwide, with 70,000 copies sold in Denmark.

The fourth single, "I'm Gonna Be Around" was re-produced by Per Magnusson and David Kreuger for its single release. The song was "written especially for the United States" according to lead singer Jascha Richter. It was later included on the compilation album MLTR (1999). It is the last studio album to feature bassist Søren Madsen, who left the band three years after.

Track listing

Certifications and sales

References

1997 albums
Michael Learns to Rock albums
Albums produced by Per Magnusson
Albums produced by David Kreuger